Lützelsee is a lake north of Hombrechtikon, Canton of Zurich, Switzerland.

External links
http://www.lützelsee.ch  website about the lake

Hombrechtikon
Lakes of the canton of Zürich
LLutzelsee